Parotocinclus cristatus is a species of catfish in the family Loricariidae. It is native to South America, where it is known from coastal rivers near Ilhéus in the state of Bahia in Brazil. The species reaches  in total length.

Parotocinclus cristatus is sometimes referred to as the dwarf pleco, although the term "pleco" (a shortened form of "plecostomus") is generally used to refer only to members of the subfamily Hypostominae, and its use to refer to other loricariids is less common. Despite this, "dwarf pleco" is sometimes applied to the genus Parotocinclus as a whole, including in academic literature.

References

Loricariidae
Otothyrinae
Fish described in 1977
Freshwater fish of Brazil